Pooram pronounced  is an annual festival, which is celebrated in temples dedicated to goddesses Durga or Kali  held especially in Valluvanadu area and other adjoining parts of north-central Kerala (Present Palakkad, Thrissur, Kannur, Kasaragod and Malappuram districts) after the summer harvest. Harimattom pooram is the one of the famous pooram in Ernakulam. An example of a famous pooram is Thirumandhamkunnu Pooram which has an active participation of 11 Lakh people across the country. Most pooram festivals have at least one ornately decorated elephant being paraded in the procession taken out of the temple precincts. However, there are some well known poorams, such as Anthimahakalankavu Vela, Chelakkara, Aryankavu Pooram at shoranur Palakkad and Machad mamangam near Wadakkanchery that do not use the caparisoned elephant, instead go for stilted mannequins of horses or bullocks. Vela is also a festival like pooram. Thrissur Pooram is the most famous of all poorams, known for fire works. The second best known Pooram in Kerala is Uthralikavu Pooram. Kavassery pooram is well known for fireworks during afternoon. Some other well-known pooram festivals are Arattupuzha-Peruvanam Pooram, Chalissery Pooram, Anthimahakalankavu Vela, Nenmara Vallangi Vela, Chinakathoor pooram, Mannarkkad Pooram, Kavassery Pooram, Pariyanampatta Pooram, Harimattom Pooram and Thirumandhamkunnu Pooram. Peruvanam-Arattupuza pooram is celebrating its 1436th year in 2018.

Musical ensembles

A melam is a classical performance of different kind of musical instruments that are unique to Kerala and is something akin to the jazz. The most traditional of all melams is called Pandi Melam which is generally performed outside the temple, during the festival. Another kind of melam is called Panchari Melam, which is similar to Pandi Melam going by the kind of instruments, but played inside the temple and following a different rhythmic beat.

Panchavadyam (pancha in Sanskrit means five) is another classical musical ensemble performed in Kerala.  Here, five different kinds of instruments create a breathtaking and fastmoving percussion performance. The five instruments are Madhalam, Kombu, Edakka, Elathalam and Timila.

Thayambaka is a type of solo chenda performance that developed in the south Indian state of Kerala, in which the main player at the centre improvises rhythmically on the beats of half-a-dozen or a few more chenda and ilathalam players around.

Other attractions
Interesting attractions of Pooram can be seen in the Valluvanad and Talappilly region. There is the Harijan Vela or Parayar Vela as well as the Tholpavakoothu, a traditional shadow puppetry show.
Harimattom Temple is situated near Tripunithura. just 7 km from there. The temple festival is started on Malayalam month Medam star UTTRAM. The main highlight of the festival is harimattom pooram which is on the 7th day of the festival. The main attraction of this pooram is kudamattam and famous pandimellam with the presence of most of the famous 10 elephants from Kerala. The one of the most important things is the Harimattom pooram and festival is conducting as per keeping the Kerala tradition, beliefs and culture.

See also
Thrissur Pooram
Kollam Pooram
Thirumandhamkunnu Pooram
Uthralikavu Pooram
Machad Mamangam
Chinakkathoor Pooram
Bhajanamadom pooram
Kavassery pooram

Image gallery

External links

5 Year Festival Calendar
Thrissur Pooram 2009 - photos
Pooram - Community Website

Elephant festivals in Kerala
Tourism in Kerala
Hindu festivals in Kerala